Afua Hirsch (born 1981) is a British writer and broadcaster. She has worked as a journalist for The Guardian newspaper, and was the Social Affairs and Education Editor for Sky News from 2014 until 2017.

Early life
Afua Hirsch was born in Stavanger, Norway, to a British father and an Akan mother from Ghana, and was raised in Wimbledon, southwest London. Her paternal grandfather, Hans (later John), who was Jewish, had fled Berlin in 1938. Her great-uncle is the metallurgist, Sir Peter Hirsch. Her maternal grandfather, who graduated from the University of Cambridge, was involved in establishing the post-independence education system in Ghana but later became a political exile.

Hirsch was educated at the private Wimbledon High School, and then studied philosophy, politics, and economics at St Peter's College, Oxford (1999–2002). After her graduation with a Bachelor of Arts degree, she took the Graduate Diploma in Law at the BPP Law School. She qualified as a barrister in 2006 and trained at Doughty Street Chambers.

Career

Hirsch began working as a lawyer in criminal defence, public and international law.

Journalism and writings
Hirsch was a legal correspondent for The Guardian. She has lived in Britain and Senegal, and served as The Guardians West Africa correspondent, based in Accra, Ghana. From 2014 to 2017, she was the Social Affairs and Education Editor at Sky News.

Hirsch contributed the piece "What Does It Mean to Be African?" to Margaret Busby's 2019 anthology New Daughters of Africa.

Guardian article about Nelson's Column
In August 2017, in The Guardian, Hirsch questioned whether Nelson's Column should remain in place, with the implication it might be removed. Not long afterward, the art historian and former museum director Sir Roy Strong said the suggestion the column should be taken down was a "ridiculous" viewpoint, commenting that "Once you start rewriting history on that scale, there won't be a statue or a historic house standing....The past is the past. You can't rewrite history". The following May, Hirsch said the idea of removing Nelson's Column distracted from her main point that Britain should look more carefully at its past to understand itself better today. In an article introducing her television documentary, The Battle for Britain's Heroes, Hirsch stated that she "wasn't actually waiting in a bulldozer, ready to storm Trafalgar Square, as some people seemed to believe".

Brit(ish)

Hirsch's book Brit(ish): On Race, Identity and Belonging was published by Jonathan Cape in January 2018. The book is part-memoir and discusses black history, culture and politics in the context of Britain, Senegal and Ghana. It is a Sunday Times bestseller. Hirsch was awarded a Royal Society of Literature Jerwood Prize for Non-Fiction while writing it in 2016.

Television
Hirsch has been a panellist on the Sky News discussion programme The Pledge (UK TV programme).

The Battle for Britain's Heroes
In the television programme The Battle for Britain's Heroes, first broadcast by Britain's Channel 4 in late May 2018, Hirsch raised lesser-known aspects of the career of former British prime minister Winston Churchill, such as his attitude to Indians and advocacy of tear gassing "uncivilised tribes" in Mesopotamia (now partly modern-day Iraq) after the First World War. In his review of the programme, Hugo Rifkind in The Times wrote that the "subtext is often that Hirsch is attacking Britain in even mentioning this stuff", which itself implies, because of her own background that it "is frankly uppity of her", but Hirsch does not let "her views be defined in opposition to those of her detractors".

African Renaissance: When Art Meets Power
In 2020, Hirsch presented the three-year documentary series African Renaissance: When Art Meets Power on BBC Four. Hirsch visited Ethiopia, Senegal and Kenya, meeting musicians and artists, and recounting the history of each country.

In August 2021, it was announced Hirsch's production company Born in Me company had signed a deal with Fremantle.

Recognition
Hirsh was on the panel of judges for the 2019 Booker Prize for Fiction that made Margaret Atwood and Bernardine Evaristo joint winners, causing much controversy.

Later that year, Hirsch was included in the 2020 edition of the Powerlist of the most influential Britons from African/African-Caribbean heritage.

Hirsch was cited as one of the top 100 most influential Africans by New African magazine in 2020. Furthermore, in the Powerlist 2021, she made the top 10, ranking ninth-most influential person of African or African Caribbean heritage in the United Kingdom.

Personal life
Hirsch met Sam, her partner, while each was pursuing a legal career. He is from Tottenham, North London, and of Ghanaian descent. The couple's daughter was born in 2011.

Bibliography

Books
 Brit(ish): On Race, Identity and Belonging, London: Jonathan Cape, 2018, 
 Equal to Everything: Judge Brenda and the Supreme Court (for children), Legal Action Group, 2019

Selected articles
 "What's It Like Being Black in Norway?". The Guardian, 26 May 2013
 "Britain: Rainbow Nation, Racist Background", Prospect, 16 March 2017
 "Toppling Statues? Here's Why Nelson's Column Should Be Next". The Guardian, 22 August 2017
 "The Fantasy of 'Free Speech, Prospect, 16 February 2018
 "The Racism That Killed George Floyd Was Built in Britain". The Guardian, 3 June 2020
 "Afua Hirsch on the Crucial Black History Lessons All Schools Should Be Teaching". Vogue, 15 June 2020

References

External links
Afua Hirsch official website

 

1981 births
Living people
21st-century British journalists
Alumni of St Peter's College, Oxford
Black British radio presenters
Black British television personalities
Black British women writers
British bloggers
British expatriates in Ghana
British expatriates in Senegal
British women bloggers
British women journalists
English human rights activists
English legal writers
English people of Ashanti descent
English people of German-Jewish descent
English people of Ghanaian descent
Norwegian emigrants to the United Kingdom
Norwegian people of German-Jewish descent
Norwegian people of Ghanaian descent
People educated at Wimbledon High School
People from Stavanger
The Guardian journalists
Women human rights activists